Risto Stijović (8 October 1894 Podgorica, Principality of Montenegro – 20 December 1974 Belgrade, SR Serbia, SFRY) was a Yugoslav and Serbian sculptor, considered to be one of the most original artists of his time.

Biography
He was born in centre of Montenegrin capital Podgorica. In 1912 he enrolled in Serbian school of fine arts in the class of Đorđe Jovanović. Stijović described himself as an ethnic Serb. After the war broke out he joined the Serbian Army and retreated across Albania to Corfu. In 1916 he moved to Marseille, furthering his education at Marseille art school on French government scholarship, and then on to Paris the following year, where he continued at École des Beaux-Arts. He lived for years in Paris, where he met his wife, Jeanette, whom he married in 1922. Considered one of the most talented sculptors of the early 1920s, he exhibited together with Picasso, Matisse, Pompon and Maillol. In 1928 he moved back to Belgrade where he became professor at Third Male Gymnasium. In 1941 he was arrested and imprisoned in Banjica concentration camp, where he spent the rest of WW2. After the war he continued his life in Belgrade, becoming a member of SASA in 1965. He died in  Belgrade in 1974. He was buried in the Čepurci cemetery of Podgorica. Stijović's work was inspired by Yugoslav nature and culture. He is considered to be the most important sculptor from Montenegro. He is considered to be a master of sculpturing animal figures.

References

External links

Montenegrin Art/Sculpture
Legacy

Yugoslav artists
Yugoslav sculptors
Montenegrin sculptors
Artists from Podgorica
1894 births
1974 deaths
20th-century sculptors